Balita Pilipinas Ngayon is a Philippine television news broadcasting show broadcast by GMA News TV. Anchored by Maki Pulido and Mark Salazar, it premiered on July 11, 2011. The show concluded on May 31, 2019.

Format
It served as the spin-off of Balita Pilipinas (later Balita Pilipinas Primetime) and is anchored by Maki Pulido and Mark Salazar with its regional reporters from GMA stations in Luzon, Visayas and Mindanao. The newscast is different from Balita Pilipinas Primetime, it features different headlines from the different regions of the Philippines.

Segments
 Balitang Luzon
 Balitang Mindanao
 Balitang Visayas
 Breaking News
 IM Ready
 Pasyal Pilipinas
 Patok sa Pinas
 Ronda Probinsya
 Showbiz Spotlight

References

2011 Philippine television series debuts
2019 Philippine television series endings
Filipino-language television shows
GMA Integrated News and Public Affairs shows
GMA News TV original programming
Philippine television news shows